Zajac is a common Slavic name, meaning “hare”. Variants include Zajtich, Zaek, Zając, Zajec, Zajić, Zajíc, Zayak, Zayats, Zayets, Zients, Ziontz, Zionce, and Zajonc. A related Russian surname is Zaytsev. Notable people with the surname include:

 Andrzej Zając (born 1956), Polish Paralympian
 Bogdan Zając (born 1972), Polish football defender
 Bojan Zajić (born 1980), Serbian football player
 Darcy Zajac (born 1986), Canadian professional ice hockey player
 Dolora Zajick (born 1952) is an American mezzo-soprano opera singer who specializes in the Verdian repertoire.
 Elaine Zayak (born 1965), American figure skater
 Ihor S. Zajac, discoverer of Zajacite-(Ce), a rare radioactive fluoride mineral in Quebec
 Jack Zajac (born 1929), American artist
 Jan Zajíc (1950–1969), Czech student and political protester
 Jeffrey Zients (born 1966), an American business executive and government official
 Joanna Zając (born 1990), Polish snowboarder
 Józef Zając (1891–1963), Polish general and pilot
 Lesław Zając (born 1950), Polish runner
 Marcel Zajac (born 1998), Canadian soccer player
 Marcin Zając (born 1975), Polish football midfielder
 Marek Zając (born 1973), Polish football defender
 Oleksandr Zayets (1962–2007), Soviet/Ukrainian football player
 Richard Zajac (born 1976), Slovak football player
 Rudolf Zajac (born 1951), former Minister of Health of Slovakia
 Serhiy Zayets (born 1969), Ukrainian football player
 Stanisław Zając (born 1949), Polish politician
 Tomáš Zajíc, Czech footballer
 Travis Zajac (born 1985), Canadian ice hockey player
 Vadym Zayats (born 1974), Ukrainian football player
 Velimir Zajec (born 1956), Croatian football player
 Zbyněk Zajíc (1376–1411), Czech nobleman

See also
 
 Zając, Masovian Voivodeship (east-central Poland)
 Zaječar, city in eastern Serbia
 10626 Zajíc, asteroid belt

Slavic-language surnames
Surnames from nicknames